Aluminium formate is the aluminium salt of formic acid, with the chemical formula Al(HCOO)3. It can be produced via the reaction of aluminium soaps and formic acid. Reaction between formic acid and aluminium hydroxide yields Al(HCOO)3(CO2)0.75(H2O)0.25(HCOOH)0.25. Upon activation at 180 °C, guest molecules are removed to obtain Al(HCOO)3.

References

Further reading

 

Aluminium compounds
Formates
Metal-organic frameworks